, there were about 92,000 electric vehicles registered in the U.S. state of Washington. , 7.8% of new vehicle sales in Washington were electric.

In 2021, Washington was ranked by Bumper.com as the best state in the country for electric vehicle ownership.

Government policy
In April 2021, the state legislature passed a bill requiring all new cars sold by 2030 to be electric; however, it was vetoed by Governor Jay Inslee. The legislature passed another bill again in March 2022, which was signed into law by Inslee, which sets an official target of 2030 for the phase-out of gasoline-powered vehicles, but does not explicitly ban their sale after that date.

In December 2021, Governor Inslee proposed a $7,500 state tax rebate for electric vehicle purchases; however, the rebate failed in the state legislature.

By region

Seattle
, 11.7% of new vehicle sales in King County were electric.

In June 2021, Pierce County passed an ordinance requiring all new homes built from January 2022 to have dedicated parking spaces for electric vehicle charging.

Spokane
In 2021, the Spokane Police Department purchased its first electric vehicles, with a plan of transitioning the department's fleet to electric by 2030; however, the new vehicles were met with significant pushback from officers, and subsequently withdrawn from the flet.

In March 2022, Spokane introduced a surcharge on gasoline and diesel used by city vehicles. The city plants to convert its entire fleet to electric by 2030.

References

Road transportation in Washington (state)
Washington